Pirappancode Murali (born 12 June 1943) is a noted poet, lyricist, playwright, library activist and politician from Kerala, India. He represented Vamanapuram constituency in 10th (1996) and 11th (2001) Kerala Legislative Assemblies. He wrote lyrics for over fifty plays and wrote ten plays. He was one of the founders of theater troupe Sangha Chetana. He got many awards including Government of Kerala Award for Best Lyricist and Kerala Sahitya Akademi Award for Best Playwright.

Biography
Murali was born on 12 June 1943 in Pirappancode, Thiruvananthapuram district to N. Sankaranarayana Kurup and L. Bharathiyamma.

He was a member of the AISF District Committee from 1960 to 1963. He joined CPI in 1962 and after splitting became member of CPI(M). From 1972 he is CPI (M) District Committee member and from 1991 he is CPI (M) District Secretariat member. He was one of the founding state committee members of the Kerala Socialist Youth Federation (KSYF) and became State General Secretary of KSYF from 1974 to 1977. He also held several other positions like Manikkal Panchayat President (1979-1984), Member of the Thiruvananthapuram District Council (1990-1994), District President of the Kerala Karshaka Sangham (Kerala Farmers association) and Member of the Karshaka sangam State Working Committee from 1992.

He was elected to the Kerala Granthashala sangam (Kerala Library Association) district committee in 1992 and later held several other positions in Karshaka Sangam including district secretary, state general body member and executive committee member. Editor-in-Chief of State Library Council's distinguished magazine Granthalokam; he held several other positions including state committee member of the Purogamana Kala Sahitya Sangham (Progressive Art and Literature Society), member of the Senate of the University of Kerala (1980-1984), member of the Thonnakkal Ashan Memorial Committee (1987-1991) and executive committee member of the Kerala Sangeetha Nataka Akademi.

He wrote and published many poetry collections; wrote lyrics for more than 50 plays; he was one of the founding members of 'Sangha Chetana', a dynamic theater troupe in Malayalam theater.

Works
Sangha Gadha (lyrics)
Sangha Ganam (lyrics)
Swathi Thirunal (drama)
Thottam (Poetic drama)
Sakhavu (play) Chinta Publishers, Hindi translation of ' Sakhavu' is also published.
Jathavedasse Mizhithurakkoo, ‎ Sahithya Pravarthaka Co-operative Society Ltd. 
ONV Kavyasamskriti, memoir, Kerala Bhasha institute 
Ente ONV
Pazhassiraja, Sahithya Pravarthaka Co-operative Society Ltd. 
Subhadre Suryapthri (Play), National Book Stall, 
Ramanan: Oru Pranayagatha (Play), Kerala Grandhasala Sangham

Family
He and his wife P. Radha Devi have one daughter Smitha Murali.

Awards and honours
1998 Government of Kerala Award for Best Lyricist
1989 Kerala Sahitya Akademi Award for Drama
1996 Nana Award for Best Lyricist
2002 Abu Dhabi Sakthi Award (Drama)
2020 Kerala Sangeetha Nataka Akademi Fellowship

References

Communist Party of India (Marxist) politicians from Kerala
People from Thiruvananthapuram district
Living people
1943 births
Kerala MLAs 1996–2001
Kerala MLAs 2001–2006
Malayalam-language dramatists and playwrights
Dramatists and playwrights from Kerala
Malayalam-language lyricists
20th-century Indian dramatists and playwrights
Recipients of the Kerala Sahitya Akademi Award
Politicians from Thiruvananthapuram
Recipients of the Abu Dhabi Sakthi Award
Recipients of the Kerala Sangeetha Nataka Akademi Fellowship